Eshele Botende (born May 22, 1970 in Kinshasa, Democratic Republic of the Congo) is a retired Congolese football goalkeeper. He played for Kaizer Chiefs, Maritimo and for a brief period in West Ham.

External links

11v11.com
 

1970 births
Living people
Footballers from Kinshasa
Democratic Republic of the Congo footballers
Democratic Republic of the Congo expatriate footballers
Democratic Republic of the Congo expatriate sportspeople in South Africa
Democratic Republic of the Congo expatriate sportspeople in Portugal
Expatriate soccer players in South Africa
Expatriate footballers in Portugal
Kaizer Chiefs F.C. players
C.S. Marítimo players
Primeira Liga players
Association football goalkeepers
21st-century Democratic Republic of the Congo people